Luau is a town in central Cuanza Sul Province of Angola. It lies at an altitude of 1501 metres (4927 feet).

Populated places in Cuanza Sul Province